"Heroes" is a song co-written and recorded by American country music artist Paul Overstreet.  It was released in February 1991 as the second single and title track from his album Heroes.  The song reached number 4 on the Billboard Hot Country Singles & Tracks chart in May 1991.  It was written by Overstreet and Claire Cloninger.

Music video
The music video premiered in early 1991.

Chart performance

Year-end charts

References

1991 singles
1990 songs
Paul Overstreet songs
Song recordings produced by Brown Bannister
Songs written by Paul Overstreet
Music videos directed by Deaton-Flanigen Productions
RCA Records singles